The women's 100 metres event at the 1995 Pan American Games was held at the Estadio Atletico "Justo Roman" on 17 and 18 March.

Medalists

Results

Heats
Wind:Heat 1: +1.1 m/s, Heat 2: +0.4 m/s, Heat 3: +2.8 m/s

Final
Wind: +4.90 m/s

References

Athletics at the 1995 Pan American Games
1995
Pan